Reza Karimi is an Iranian reformist politician and agricultural engineer. He was born in Namin, Ardabil province. He is a member of the tenth Islamic Consultative Assembly from the electorate of Ardabil, Nir, Namin and Sareyn.

References

External links
 Reza Karimi Website

Living people
Deputies of Ardabil, Nir, Namin and Sareyn
People from Namin, Ardabil
Members of the 10th Islamic Consultative Assembly
Iranian reformists
Year of birth missing (living people)